Arafi is an Arabic surname. Notable people with the surname include:

Alireza Arafi (born 1959), Iranian Shia cleric
Rababe Arafi  (born 1991), middle-distance runner from Morocco

Arabic-language surnames